The trampoline gymnastics competition of the Mayagüez 2010 Central American and Caribbean Games was held 22–23 July 2010 at  in Bogotá, Colombia.



Medal summary

Men's events

Women's events

See also 
 Artistic gymnastics at the 2010 Central American and Caribbean Games
 Rhythmic gymnastics at the 2010 Central American and Caribbean Games

References

External links
  

Events at the 2010 Central American and Caribbean Games
July 2010 sports events in North America